Global Environment Outlook (GEO) is a series of reports that review the state and direction of the global environment, issued periodically by the United Nations Environment Program (UNEP). The GEO project is a response to the environmental reporting requirements of UN Agenda 21 and to a UNEP Governing Council decision of May 1995. 

It was introduced after the 1992 Rio Conference on Environment and Development, at a time when government and stakeholders lacked from a common information basis to developed a broad and comprehensive view of environmental issues. 

The reports published to date are as the following: 

Six GEO reports have been published to date: GEO-1 in 1997, GEO-2000 (ie. GEO-2) in 1999, GEO-3 in 2002, GEO-4 in 2007, GEO-5 in 2012, and GEO-6 in 2019.

GEO process

GEO is a global process conducted by the United Nations Environment Programme (UNEP). Its approach is based on the global integrated environment assessment (IEA), as well as at a regional, national and local levels around the world. The process provides an assessment of the current state of the environment, an evaluation of the effectiveness of policies and actions taken to address environmental issues, and projections of future environmental trends.

This process also includes a review of the scientific literature and consultation with a wide range of stakeholders, including governments, non-governmental organizations, and the private sector. 

The result of the process is intended to inform policy and decision-making at the national and international levels. 

The GEO way of doing a global assessment is not written but "its essential formula has been remarkably consistent": 

 It has covered a broad spectrum of issues, including socio-economic aspects 
 It adopts global and regional perspectives throughout; and with cross-scale perspectives in mind. The global issues are framed in their regional context in terms of actual policy environments, vulnerabilities, and development issues. 
 It is a collaborative and participatory process. It builds a positive impact from a constantly changing network of individuals and institutions.
 It is science-based and policy-relevant. It balances flexibility and structure for its process and concepts.
 Its analysis covers an analysis of the past, present, and future by recurring on several circuits of data and expertise, namely history, monitoring, modeling, and political science.
 It includes assessments of policies without being policy-prescriptive.

See Also
Sustainable development

References

External links
GEO Data Portal - The Environmental Database (search | map | graph | download) 
UNEP GEO Data Portal

GEO5 for Youth 
BBC Special Report - Planet Under Pressure

Environmental reports